Cossoninae is a true weevil subfamily in the family Curculionidae.

Tribes 

 Acamptini LeConte, 1876
 Acanthinomerini Voss, 1972
 Allomorphini Folwaczny, 1973 
 Aphyllurini Voss, 1955
 Araucariini Kuschel, 1966
 Choerorhinini Folwaczny, 1973
 Cossonini Schönherr, 1825
 Cryptommatini Voss, 1972
 Dryotribini LeConte, 1876
 Microxylobiini Voss, 1972
 Nesiobiini Alonso-Zarazaga and Lyal, 1999
 Neumatorini Folwaczny, 1973
 Onychiini Chapuis, 1869
 Onycholipini Wollaston, 1873
 Pentarthrini Lacordaire, 1865
 Proecini Voss, 1956
 Pseudapotrepini Champion, 1909
 Rhyncolini Gistel, 1848
 Tapiromimini Voss, 1972

Genera
These genera (and probably more) belong to the subfamily Cossoninae:

 Acamptus LeConte, 1876 i c g b
 Amaurorhinus Fairmaire, 1860 c g b
 Aphanommata Wollaston, 1873 c g b
 Apotrepus Casey, 1892 i c g b
 Carphonotus Casey, 1892 i c g b
 Caulophilus Wollaston, 1854 i c g b
 Cossonus Clairville, 1798 i c g b
 Dryotribus Horn, 1873 i c g b
 Elassoptes Horn, 1873 i c g b
 Euophryum Broun, 1909 c g b
 Hexarthrum Wollaston, 1860 i c g b
 Himatium Wollaston, 1873 i c g b
 Macrancylus LeConte, 1876 i c g b
 Macrorhyncolus Wollaston, 1873 c g b
 Macroscytalus Broun, 1881 c g b
 Mesites Schönherr, 1838 i c g b
 Micromimus Wollaston, 1873 i c g b
 Nyssonotus Casey, 1892 i c g b
 Paralicus <small>OBrien, 1984</small> c g b
 Pentarthrum Wollaston, 1854 i c g b
 Phloeophagus Schönherr, 1838 i c g b
 Proeces Schönherr, 1838 c g b
 Pselactus Broun, 1886 i c g b
 Pseudopentarthrum Wollaston, 1873 i c g b
 Rhyncolus Germar, 1817 i c g b
 Stenancylus Casey, 1892 i c g b
 Stenomimus Wollaston, 1873 i c g b
 Stenoscelis Wollaston, 1861 i c g b
 Stenotrupis Wollaston, 1873 i c g b
 Tomolips Wollaston, 1873 i c g b
 Trichacorynus'' Blatchley, 1916 i c g b

Data sources: i = ITIS, c = Catalogue of Life, g = GBIF, b = Bugguide.net

References

External links 
 
 

 
Beetle subfamilies